Rodolfo Saglimbeni (born 8 December 1962, in Barquisimeto, Venezuela) is a conductor.  He studied music in Venezuela and then at the Royal Academy of Music of London with Colin Metters, John Carewe and George Hurst, obtaining his degree with Honors.

Saglimbeni studied under Franco Ferrara at the Accademia Nazionale di Santa Cecilia (Rome) in 1981. He has served as Associate Director of the Caracas Sinfonietta and Venezuela Symphony Orchestra, as well as in the role of founder and Artistic Director of the Great Marshal of Ayacucho Symphony orchestra, and Musical Director of the Teresa Carreño Cultural Complex.

In 1985, he won 2nd prize at France's International Besançon Competition for Young Conductors; where he was also the youngest conductor that year. He returned to Venezuela in 1987. He has been invited to conduct symphony orchestras in France, Italy, Spain, United Kingdom, Brazil, Colombia, Peru, Ecuador, Chile, Argentina and El Salvador.

In 1990, he was hired as tutor and later as Co-director of the summer course of the Canford Summer School of music (which moved location and is now the Sherborne Summer School of Music) in England.    He has been awarded the prize of Best Director of the Year and National Prize  of the Artist and decorated with the Order “Jose Felix Ribas” First Class. In March 1999, he won the Director of the Americas Award in Santiago de Chile. In 2003, he was appointed artistic director of the Municipal Symphony Orchestra of Caracas. In 2019 Saglimbeni was appointed Principal Conductor of the National Symphony Orchestra of Chile.

References

Sources

External links 
Web site of Rodolfo Saglimbeni
Webpage of Orquesta Sinfónica Municipal de Caracas

1962 births
Living people
People from Barquisimeto
Venezuelan conductors (music)
Male conductors (music)
Venezuelan classical musicians
Alumni of the Royal Academy of Music
Prize-winners of the International Besançon Competition for Young Conductors
Accademia Nazionale di Santa Cecilia alumni
21st-century conductors (music)
21st-century male musicians